Manufacturing, Science and Finance (or the Manufacturing, Science and Finance Union; almost exclusively known as MSF) was a trade union in Britain. Over eighty members of Parliament (primarily members of the Labour Party) were members.

History
The MSF was the result of a merger in January 1988 between the Association of Scientific, Technical and Managerial Staffs (ASTMS) and the Technical, Administrative and Supervisory Section (TASS). In 1991, it had 604,000 members, but this fell to 446,000 in 1996, the most rapid decline of any major British union.

In 2001 the MSF merged with the Amalgamated Engineering and Electrical Union to form Amicus. The General Secretary of MSF from 1992 until the merger with Amicus was Roger Lyons, who continued as Joint General Secretary of Amicus's MSF section. In 2007 Amicus merged with the TGWU to form Unite.

Amalgamations
Several unions amalgamated with the MSF:

 1988: Church of England Children's Society Staff Association, Imperial Supervisors' Association, United Friendly Field Management Staff Association
 1989: Imperial Group Staff Association
 1990: Health Visitors' Association
 1991: Australian Mutual Provident Society
 1993: Hospital Physicists Association, National Union of Scalemakers
 1994: Ceron Research Staff Association
 1997: College of Health Care Chaplains
 1998: Communication Managers' Association
 1999: Britannic Supervisory Union, Corporation of London Staff Association, National Union of Insurance Workers, Neilson Staff Association
 2000: Lloyds Registry Staff Association, Union of Textile Workers
 2001: Leicester Housing Association Staff Association

Leadership

General Secretaries
1988: Clive Jenkins and Ken Gill
1988: Ken Gill
1992: Roger Lyons

Assistant General Secretaries
1988: Roger Lyons and Barbara Switzer
1992: John Chowcat and Barbara Switzer
1997: John Chowcat
1999: Post vacant

References

External links
Catalogue of the MSF archives, held at the Modern Records Centre, University of Warwick

Defunct trade unions of the United Kingdom
1988 establishments in the United Kingdom
Trade unions established in 1988
Trade unions disestablished in 2001